PRSM or PrSM may refer to:
 Precision Strike Missile, a ground-to-ground missile.
 Power Rangers Super Megaforce, a season of the television series Power Rangers Megaforce